Sulekha Talwalkar is a Marathi film, television and theatre actress working in Maharashtra.

Career
Sulekha Talwalkar entered into an acting career while she was studying at the Ramnarain Ruia College, Matunga, Mumbai. She was part of the theatre group Natyawalay where she acted in her first commercial play Saatchya Aat Gharat. A film with the same name was later created in 2004 on similar story line. Her first television show was Teri Bhi Chup Meri Bhi Chup that aired on Zee TV. She later on acted in various Hindi TV shows of Adhikari Brothers. In 1995, she played the side role of Shefali Jadhav in the Marathi film Aai which was directed by Mahesh Manjrekar.

Sulekha Talwalkar played various side roles in popular Marathi television shows like Avantika, Asambhav, Kunku, Shejari Shejari Pakke Shejari and Majha Hoshil Na aired on Zee Marathi. In 2007, she acted in the film Chandrakant Kulkarni. Her 2008's film Tuzya Mazyat was loosely based on the 1998 English film Stepmom. Sulekha Talwalkar played second wife of Shashank (played by Sachin Khedekar) who is earlier married to Asmita (played by Mrinal Kulkarni) and also has two children. In 2009, she played the lead role in the film Tinhisaanja. The film was about the generation gap and taking care of one's older parents. Sandeep Kulkarni played her husband and her in-laws were played by actors Ramesh Deo and Ashalata Wabgaonkar. Her 2012 film Shyamche Vadil saw her playing the lead role of Leena, a shrewd wife who harasses her husband for not bringing the money for the household. After seeing such harassment for 22 years, their son Shyam decides to fight for his father's rights claiming their divorce. The role of father Madhav is played by Tushar Dalvi and of Shyam by debutant Chinmay Udgirkar.

Recently in 2012 she appeared in the Marathi play Mahasagar along with a star cast of Subodh Bhave, Ashalata Wabgaonkar, Shailesh Datar and others. Originally written by Jaywant Dalvi, the play was remade after 20 years by the actress Neelam Shirke under her banner Asmi Productions and directed by Neena Kulkarni. Directed by Vijaya Mehta, the original star cast included notable actors like Vikram Gokhale, Usha Nadkarni, Nana Patekar, Macchindra Kambli and Bharti Achrekar.

Personal life
Talwalkar was born as Sulekha Dharadhar on 8 October. She is the only child of her parents. She completed her education from King George School, Mumbai and Ramnarain Ruia College. She is married to Amber Talwalkar, who is one of the director of Talwalkars, a major chain of health club in India.  Her mother-in-law Smita Talwalkar was a film and television producer and also actress. She has two children, a son named Arya Talwalkar and a daughter named Tia Talwalkar.

Filmography

References

External links 
 

Actresses in Marathi cinema
Actresses in Marathi theatre
Living people
Indian television actresses
Marathi actors
Actresses from Mumbai
1971 births